is a retired Japanese judoka.

Kitada was born in Shirahama, Wakayama and began judo at the age of 10. She graduated from Nippon Sport Science University in 2001.

In 2002, she participated Asian Games held in Busan and won a gold medal in the Extra Lightweight category.

Kitada also won a gold medal at Paris Super World Cup, Otto World Cup Hamburg and other international championships but did not participate in the Olympic Games or World Championships mainly due to  7 times world champion Ryoko Tamura.

In 2005, Kitada finally participated in the World Championships but was defeated by Yanet Bermoy from Cuba and Alina Alexandra Dumitru from Romania. In April 2006, Kitada retired.

As of 2010, Kitada coaches judo at the Yoshida Dojo. and Shutoku High School.

References

Japanese female judoka
People from Wakayama Prefecture
1978 births
Living people
Asian Games medalists in judo
Judoka at the 2002 Asian Games
Asian Games gold medalists for Japan
Medalists at the 2002 Asian Games
Universiade medalists in judo
Universiade bronze medalists for Japan